This is a list of churches in Conwy, a unitary authority area in North Wales.

Active churches

Defunct churches

References 

 
Conwy